Athens-Clarke County may refer to

Athens, Georgia
Clarke County, Georgia
Athens-Clarke County metropolitan area

See also
Athens (disambiguation)
Clarke County (disambiguation)